Commonwealth Games

Omar Brown (born 21 June 1982 in Trelawny) is a Jamaican sprinter who specialises in the 200 metres.

He was successful as a junior athlete, winning the silver and bronze medals in the 200 m and 100 metres races at the 1999 World Youth Championships. The following year he finished fourth at the World Junior Championships. He ran collegiately for the University of Arkansas.

He won the 200 metres race at the 2006 Commonwealth Games, and was ranked ninth in the world for the 200 metres that year by Track and Field News magazine.

He suffered a setback in 2007 the form of an ankle injury. He returned at the 2008 Jamaican trials but suffered a hamstring injury, caused by a faulty technique due to pain in his ankle. He underwent surgery in September 2008 to remove a bone spur, but the scar tissue from the surgery hampered his track comeback. He did not return until the end of the 2009 season, taking fourth place in the 200 m at the Shanghai Golden Grand Prix.

Personal life
On 3 November 2007, he married Jamaican Olympian Veronica Campbell.

Personal bests

All information taken from IAAF profile.

References

External links
 

1982 births
Living people
Jamaican male sprinters
Athletes (track and field) at the 2006 Commonwealth Games
Commonwealth Games gold medallists for Jamaica
Athletes (track and field) at the 1999 Pan American Games
Arkansas Razorbacks men's track and field athletes
People from Trelawny Parish
Commonwealth Games medallists in athletics
Pan American Games competitors for Jamaica
Medallists at the 2006 Commonwealth Games